Joop van der Leij (14 October 1898 – 3 March 1991) was a Dutch athlete. He competed in the men's javelin throw at the 1928 Summer Olympics.

References

External links
 

1898 births
1991 deaths
Athletes (track and field) at the 1928 Summer Olympics
Dutch male javelin throwers
Olympic athletes of the Netherlands
Athletes from Amsterdam
20th-century Dutch people